"The Matador" is a song written by Don Pfrimmer and Bob Morris, and recorded by American country music artist Sylvia.  It was released in April 1981 as the fourth single from the album Drifter.  The song reached #7 on the Billboard Hot Country Singles & Tracks chart.

Chart performance

References

1981 singles
1981 songs
Sylvia (singer) songs
RCA Records singles
Songs written by Don Pfrimmer
Song recordings produced by Tom Collins (record producer)